Angel: The Hollower is a trade paperback collecting the three-issue comic book series Buffy the Vampire Slayer: Angel based on the Buffy the Vampire Slayer television series.

Story description

General synopsis
Angel has an encounter with someone from his past, and now has to face a threat he had hoped had been long destroyed: the Hollower. The Hollower is a natural predator of vampires. The hideous thing might be linked to Angel's salvation or his destruction.

The Hollower #1

Angel investigates an old horror from his past. He hopes he is strong enough to overcome the monster's unusual powers.

The Hollower #2

Angel must now face a threat he had hoped had been long-destroyed. Yet the abomination known as the 'Hollower' just might be connected with Angel's salvation or destruction.

The Hollower #3

Angel comes up against the old enemy of vampires, the 'Hollower' in a battle for survival.

Continuity
Supposed to be set in Buffy the Vampire Slayer season 3. Takes place immediately after Pale Reflections, and immediately before Double Cross.

Canonical issues
Buffy comics such as this one are not usually considered by fans as canonical. However, unlike fan fiction, overviews summarizing their story, written early in the writing process, were approved by both Fox and Joss Whedon (or his office), and the books were therefore later published as officially Buffy merchandise.

Comics based on Buffy the Vampire Slayer